Let's Go Steady Again is a compilation album containing the works of American pop singer Neil Sedaka. It was released in the US in 1976 on the RCA Victor label. It contains some of Sedaka's lesser-known hits that he recorded during his years with RCA from 1959-1966.

This album is not to be confused with another album of the same name, released in 1979 in Great Britain on the RCA Camden label.

Track listing

All of the songs here listed saw 45 rpm singles releases during Sedaka's days with RCA, and eight of them charted at the time of their original release.

Side A
 (1) "Let's Go Steady Again" (1963)
 Peaked at #26 on the pop charts in 1963
 (2) "Circulate" (1961)
 B-side of "Alice in Wonderland" in 1963; title track of the Circulate album in 1961
 (3) "The Dreamer" (1963)
 Peaked at #47 on the pop charts in 1963
 (4) "Bad Girl" (1963)
 Peaked at #33 on the pop charts in 1963
 (5) "I Go Ape!" (1959)
 Peaked at #42 on the pop charts in 1959; reached #9 on British pop charts

Side B
 (6) "The World Through A Tear" (1965)
 Peaked at #76 on the pop charts in 1965
 (7) "One-Way Ticket (To The Blues)" (1959)
 B-side of "Oh! Carol" in 1959, reached #1 on Japanese pop charts in 1960
 (8) "Alice In Wonderland" (1963)
 Peaked at #17 on the pop charts in 1963
 (9) "Sunny" (1964)
 Peaked at #86 on the pop charts in 1964
 (10) "The Answer To My Prayer" (1965)
 Peaked at #89 on the pop charts in 1965-1966

1976 compilation albums
Neil Sedaka compilation albums